The list of ship launches in 1782 includes a chronological list of some ships launched in 1782.


References

1782
Ship launches